Bernie Treweek (27 September 1914 – 27 November 1957) was an Australian rules footballer who played for the Carlton Football Club and Fitzroy Football Club in the Victorian Football League (VFL).

Notes

External links 

Bernie Treweek's profile at Blueseum

1914 births
1957 deaths
Carlton Football Club players
Fitzroy Football Club players
Australian rules footballers from Victoria (Australia)